Hellenberg is a surname. Notable people with the surname include: 

Freja Hellenberg (born 1989), Swedish footballer 
Ignace Hellenberg (died 2004), French art dealer